Prunus phaeosticta, the dark-spotted cherry, is a species of Prunus native to China, including Taiwan, and southeast Asia, including far eastern India, Bangladesh, Burma, Thailand, Laos and Vietnam. It goes by a number of different names in Chinese, including 黑星櫻, black star cherry, 墨點櫻桃 and 墨点樱桃, ink point cherry, and 腺葉桂櫻, gland leaf cherry. It gets its specific epithet and its common names from the small dark spots (glands) on the undersides of its leaves. Formosan rock macaques (Macaca cyclopis) eat the fruit.

Subspecies and forms
A widespread species, it displays variety in its morphology, leading to a number of described putative subspecies, varieties and forms.
L. phaeosticta f. pubipedunculata T.T. Yu & L.T. Lu
P. phaeosticta f. ciliospinosa
P. phaeosticta f. dentigera Rehder
P. phaeosticta f. lasioclada Rehder
P. phaeosticta f. phaeosticta 
P. phaeosticta f. puberula (Yü & Lu) Q.H.Chen
P. phaeosticta subsp. ilicifolia (Hance) Maxim.
P. phaeosticta. subsp. phaeosticta 
P. phaeosticta var. ancylocarpa
P. phaeosticta var. dimorphophylla
P. phaeosticta var. promeccocarpa

References

External links

phaeosticta
Flora of Assam (region)
Flora of Bangladesh
Flora of Indo-China
Flora of South-Central China
Flora of Southeast China
Flora of Taiwan
Flora of Tibet
Plants described in 1883